Wazamar was the ruler of the Khwarazm region of Central Asia in the late 3rd-century.

Sources
 
 

4th-century deaths
3rd-century births
3rd-century Iranian people
4th-century Iranian people
Zoroastrian rulers